Portrait of Shorty is an album by American jazz trumpeter composer and arranger Shorty Rogers which was released on the RCA Victor label in 1958.

Reception

Allmusic awarded the album 3 stars. On All About Jazz Jack Bowers stated "there’s plenty of cleverly contoured music to appreciate. And it must be said that no other trumpeter ever sounded exactly like Shorty, who had a lively and swinging language all his own. His voicings for the trumpet section were similarly unexampled, and made any Rogers arrangement almost immediately identifiable. ...everything works, thanks to Shorty’s remarkable charts and the uncanny ability of his colleagues to speak volumes in only a few phrases".

The tune "Play, Boy" was written especially for and first appeared on a two-record (LP) set issued in 1957 by Playboy Magazine honoring the winners of the magazine’s first Jazz Poll. Shorty Rogers had placed fourth in the trumpet voting.

Track listing 
All compositions by Shorty Rogers.

 "Saturnian Sleigh Ride" - 3:48
 "Martians Lullaby" - 7:13
 "The Line Backer" - 4:11
 "Grand Slam" - 4:57
 "Play! Boy" - 5:43
 "A Geophysical Ear" - 3:46
 "Red Dog Play" - 4:49
 "Bluezies" - 6:40   
Recorded in Los Angeles, CA on July 15, 1957, (tracks 1, 3, 5 & 6) and August 11, 1957 (tracks 2, 4, 7 & 8)

Personnel 
Shorty Rogers - trumpet, flugelhorn, arranger
Conte Candoli, Pete Candoli , Don Fagerquist, Conrad Gozzo, Al Porcino - trumpet 
Harry Betts, Frank Rosolino - trombone
Bob Enevoldsen - valve trombone
George Roberts - bass trombone
Herb Geller - alto saxophone, tenor saxophone
Bill Holman, Richie Kamuca, Jack Montrose - tenor saxophone
Pepper Adams - baritone saxophone
Lou Levy - piano
Monty Budwig - bass 
Stan Levey - drums

References 

Shorty Rogers albums
1958 albums
RCA Records albums
Albums arranged by Shorty Rogers